Ismailli State Reserve or Ismayilly State Reserve was established in Azerbaijan on an area of  in 1981 for the preservation and protection of natural complexes, occupying the north part of the southern slope of Major Caucasus.

The forests are mainly formed of beeches, hornbeams and oaks, with small numbers of birch trees, cud, lime-trees, etc. Among them are chestnut-leaved oak and horehound oak that are included in the Red Book of Azerbaijan. The reserve accounts for nearly 170 animal species. 104 bird species of 13 orders are found in the reserve. Such mammals as a Brown bear, wild cat, lynx, Caucasian dear, Roe dear, Chamois and Caucasian goat populate the reserve.

See also
 Nature of Azerbaijan
 National Parks of Azerbaijan
 State Reserves of Azerbaijan
 State Game Reserves of Azerbaijan

References

State reserves of Azerbaijan
Forests of Azerbaijan
1981 establishments in Azerbaijan
Protected areas established in 1981